State Route 135 (SR 135) is a state highway in the U.S. state of California. It acts as a western bypass of U.S. Route 101 in northern Santa Barbara County that runs through the community of Los Alamos and the center of the city of Santa Maria.

Route description

SR 135 starts off as Bell Street in Los Alamos and goes along with Vandenberg Road after an intersection with Harris Grade Road before merging with State Route 1 south of Orcutt. There is a brief freeway portion at the northern split of SR 135 and SR 1, but it quickly reverts to a city street upon crossing Clark Avenue. North of Santa Maria Way, it is considered Business US 101, although signage is poor.  SR 135 continues its northbound journey as Broadway and passes through the Santa Maria Town Center shopping center at the intersection with Main Street (State Route 166). SR 135 meets US 101 again just before crossing the Santa Maria River at the Santa Barbara/San Luis Obispo county line.

SR 135 north of SR 1 is part of the National Highway System, a network of highways that are considered essential to the country's economy, defense, and mobility by the Federal Highway Administration.

History

State Route 135 is the original routing for US 101 from Santa Maria to Los Alamos until the current alignment was completed in 1933. However, instead of turning east just before old town Orcutt and then north into Santa Maria as it does currently, it continued north along what is now Graciosa Road and then Marcum Street linking up with E. Clark Avenue just north of the Orcutt water tower. It then followed Clark Avenue east through old Orcutt and turned north on Orcutt Road at the location of the current Highway 135/Clark Avenue interchange and headed north through Santa Maria.

Route 135 was created in 1964 to encompass most of the old routing.

Major intersections

See also

References

External links

California @ AARoads.com - State Route 135
Caltrans: Route 135 highway conditions
California Highways: SR 135

135
135
State Route 135
Santa Maria, California
U.S. Route 101